Rotaliotina discoidea , common name the discoid delphinula, is a species of small sea snail, a marine gastropod mollusk, in the family Liotiidae.

Description
The size of the shell varies between 4 mm and 9 mm. The shell has a discoidal shape, with a flattened spire. The periphery shows two prominent
ribs, connected by lattices which a subspinously project. The surface contains clathrate ridges, the interstices of which are finely striated.

Distribution
This marine species occurs off the Philippines, Papua New Guinea and  Australia (Queensland) and Norfolk Island and Lord Howe Island.

References

 Jenkins, B.W. 1984. Northern Australian Liotiidae. Australian Shell News 48: 8-9
 Huang, Shih-I. (2023). Nomenclatural notes on fossil liotiid taxa and description of Cyclostrema filipino n. sp. from the Philippines (Mollusca: Gastropoda, Liotiidae). Bulletin of Malacology, Taiwan. 46: 24-46.

External links
 Reeve, L.A. 1843. Monograph of the genus Delphinula. pls 1-5 in Reeve, L.A. (ed). Conchologia Iconica. London : L. Reeve & Co. Vol. 1.
 To World Register of Marine Species
 
 Australian Faunal Directory: Pseudoliotina discoidea

discoidea
Gastropods described in 1843